This is a list of places in Ireland.

All-island lists
List of counties
List of counties by area
List of counties by population
List of baronies
List of cities
List of islands
List of loughs
List of mountains
List of rivers
List of canals
List of ports
List of castles
List of cathedrals
List of Roman Catholic dioceses
List of Church of Ireland dioceses
List of megalithic monuments
List of railway stations
List of stadiums
List of lighthouses
List of windmills

Republic of Ireland-specific lists
List of airports in the Republic of Ireland
List of towns and villages in the Republic of Ireland
List of urban areas in the Republic of Ireland by population
List of county and city councils in the Republic of Ireland
List of constituencies in the Republic of Ireland

Northern Ireland-specific lists

List of towns and villages in Northern Ireland
List of settlements in Northern Ireland by population
List of district councils in Northern Ireland
List of constituencies in Northern Ireland

County-specific lists

Antrim
Navbox
List of places in County Antrim
List of civil parishes of County Antrim
List of townlands in County Antrim

Armagh 
Navbox
List of places in County Armagh
List of civil parishes of County Armagh
List of townlands in County Armagh

Carlow 
Navbox
List of townlands of County Carlow

Cavan
Navbox
List of townlands of County Cavan

Clare 
Navbox
List of townlands of County Clare

Cork
Navbox
List of townlands of County Cork

Donegal 
Navbox
List of townlands of County Donegal

Down 
Navbox
List of places in County Down
List of civil parishes of County Down
List of townlands in County Down

Dublin 
Navbox
List of streets and squares in Dublin
List of Dublin bridges and tunnels
List of rivers in County Dublin, sortable list
Rivers Navbox
List of mountains and hills of County Dublin
Mountains Navbox
List of townlands of County Dublin, a sortable list with land area, barony, civil parish, and poor law union details

Fermanagh
Navbox
List of places in County Fermanagh 
List of civil parishes of County Fermanagh
List of townlands in County Fermanagh

Galway
Navbox
List of townlands of County Galway

Kerry
Navbox
List of townlands of County Kerry

Kildare 
Navbox
List of townlands of County Kildare

Kilkenny 
Navbox
List of townlands of County Kilkenny

Laois
Navbox
List of townlands of County Laois

Leitrim 
Navbox
List of townlands of County Leitrim

Limerick
Navbox
List of townlands of County Limerick

Londonderry 
Navbox
List of places in County Londonderry
List of civil parishes of County Londonderry
List of townlands in County Londonderry

Longford
Navbox
List of townlands of County Longford

Louth
Navbox
List of townlands of County Louth

Mayo 
Navbox
 List of townlands of County Mayo
 List of loughs of County Mayo
 List of mountains and hills of County Mayo
 List of rivers of County Mayo
 List of roads of County Mayo

Meath 
Navbox
List of townlands of County Meath

Monaghan
Navbox
List of townlands of County Monaghan

Offaly 
Navbox
List of townlands of County Offaly

Roscommon 
Navbox
List of townlands of County Roscommon

Sligo 
Navbox
List of townlands of County Sligo

Tipperary
List of townlands of County Tipperary

Tyrone 
Navbox
List of places in County Tyrone
List of civil parishes of County Tyrone
List of townlands of County Tyrone

Waterford
Navbox
List of townlands of County Waterford

Westmeath 
Navbox
List of townlands of County Westmeath

Wexford
Navbox
List of townlands of County Wexford

Wicklow 
Navbox
List of townlands of County Wicklow

 
Places
Places